Johnny Herrera may refer to:

 Johnny Herrera (footballer) (born 1981), Chilean goalkeeper
 Johnny Herrera (racing driver) (born 1966), American racing driver